The 2013 President's Cup was the 63rd season of the President's Cup, a knock-out competition for Maldives' top 4 football clubs. New Radiant Sports Club were the defending champions, having beaten Victory Sports Club in last season's final on penalty shoot-out.

The final was held on 23 October 2012, in which New Radiant won the final 4-2 on extra time, claiming a record tenth President's Cup, after the scores were 2-2 at the end of normal time.

Background

Broadcasting rights
The broadcasting rights for all the matches of 2013 Maldives President's Cup were given to the Television Maldives.

Qualifier
Top 4 teams after the end of 2013 Dhivehi League third round will be qualified for the President's Cup.

Final qualifier

Semi-final qualifier

Semi-final

Final

Statistics

Scorers

Assists

References

President's Cup (Maldives)
Pres